This article lists the squads for the 2012 CONCACAF Under-20 Women's Championship, to be held in Panama. The 8 national teams involved in the tournament were required to register a squad of 20 players; only players in these squads were eligible to take part in the tournament.

Players marked (c) were named as captain for their national squad. Number of caps, players' club teams and players' age as of 1 March 2012 – the tournament's opening day.

Group A

Canada
Coach:  Andrew Olivieri

Mexico
Coach:  Roberto Medina

Group B

Cuba
Coach:  José Luis Elejalde

Guatemala
Coach:  Benjamín Monterroso

Panama
Coach:  Luis Tejada

United States
Coach:  Steve Swanson

References
 Fepafut.com Seleccion Femenina http://www.fepafut.com/seleccion-fu20.asp

Squads
2012 in youth sport